Yummy Fur may refer to:

Yummy Fur (comics), an alternative comic book series by Canadian cartoonist Chester Brown
The Yummy Fur, an indie rock band from Glasgow, formed in 1992, and disbanded 1999